Thomas Höller (born 2 June 1976) is a former Austria international footballer.

References

1976 births
Living people
Austrian footballers
Austria international footballers
FC Kärnten players
SW Bregenz players
SV Bad Aussee players
SVG Bleiburg players

Association football midfielders